Mirella Ricciardi (born 14 July 1931), " is a Kenyan-born photographer and author. She also appeared in Michelangelo Antonioni's film L'Eclisse (1962), playing the part of a woman whose backstory bore some resemblance to her own.

Early life 
Mirella Rocco is the elder daughter of her parents Mario Rocco (1893-1975) and Giselle Bunau-Varilla (1892-1978). Her father, came originally from Naples and was an Italian cavalry officer who had taken part in the First World War. Her mother, was a French born sculptress who had once been a pupil of Rodin. Both her parents were married ( but not to each other) when they set off for Africa at the end of 1928. They initially planned to elope in the Belgian Congo and make a fortune by killing elephants and selling the ivory, However, after a year-long safari Giselle became pregnant and the couple headed for Kenya to find a hospital. They finally settled in Kenya when Mirella's elder brother, Dorian Rocco (1930-2013), was born. The youngest of the three children, Orla, was born in 1933.

Mario Rocco acquired 5,000 acres on the shores of Lake Naivasha which he farmed. The children enjoyed the privileged childhood familiar to many "white" Kenyan contemporaries in the 1930s. Mirella would later look back with dismay but is always honest about the racial precepts with which she had grown up: "I had always been a white African, a product of the colonial system I had been raised in...  I considered the Africans as my servants, not human beings like myself." When Mirella Rocco was just nine, and her father was forty-seven, the East African campaign (World War II) came to Kenya in 1940, Since Kenya was then a British colony and Mario Rocco being an Italian was arrested and taken to a camp at Kabete, before being transferred to South Africa for four years. Rocco returned home, in June 1944, as, according to one source, an "old, toothless and a broken man." Between 1940 and 1944, the three children were not permitted to attend school,  so they were homeschooled. After July 1944 they were permitted to attend the Kijabe Rift valley mission school, following which they spent their final school years in Nairobi.

For two years during the 1950s, Mirella Rocco undertook an internship in Paris with the fashion photographer Harry Meerson. In 1957, a press photograph of her sitting in front of a tourism poster for Uganda and Kenya which was taken while she was visiting to New York—bore a caption stating that back in Kenya she had already "acted as cameraman, guide and hunter on more than 15 safaris". But, it was evidently clear that it was the camera that peaked her interests.

On May 26, 1957, she appeared as a guest on an episode of the TV show "What's my Line."

Personal 
Mirella Ricciardi's family life is well chronicled in her own published works. Mario Rocco died at the age of 82 in a Nairobi hospital after suffering increasingly poor health in his later years and on 5 May 1975, a month after being rushed in with a broken femur, Mirella's mother also died in Kenya.

Mirella Rocco married Lorenzo Ricciardi. They had met when he had recruited her as the "stills photographer" in connection with a movie that he was shooting in East Africa. Various sources describe Lorenzo Ricciardi as "an Italian adventurer." He has led much of his life pursued by a succession of seemingly fantastical anecdotes.  Despite his Neapolitan familial provenance, he was reportedly born in a Milanese prison because there was insufficient time for his mother to reach the hospital. As a child, he had watched the Nazis burn down his family home. Later, he made significant money by playing roulette and purchased a boat and, used it to "sail through a string of monsoons" on an "ocean-going dhow". until it sank

In 1990, Lorenzo's brief relationship with Georgiana Bronfman (née Rita Webb), the former wife of Edgar Bronfman, Sr. (now married to actor Nigel Havers), led to him being arrested in 1990  after accusations by Ms. Bronfman for an argument after a regrettable and stupid  prank. The court case was quashed due to insufficient evidence and  Mirella has written of their adventure-strewn marriage with some honesty: defining it as not always the most stable or monogamous of partnerships. However, they shared  an intense curiosity about life, seeing the world and Lorenzo while working along side his wife also played a pivotal role in supporting her as an independent photographer.

In 1971 London she published, her first volume of photographs, entitled "Vanishing Africa". According to her , her intention was "to photograph the tribal life and customs of the people of Africa before they changed forever". It was an immediate commercial success. By 2014, there had been four further photo-volumes. The couple by this time reportedly divided their lives between homes in London and in Italy.

Works 

 Vanishing Africa, revised edition 1974, Collins, London, .
 Vanishing Amazon, Abrams, New York 1991 . 
 African Saga, Collins, London 1981, .
 with Lorenzo Ricciardi: African Rainbow: Across Africa by Boat, Ebury Press, London 1989, .
 African Visions The Diary of an African Photographer, Cassell & Co, London 2000, .

References 

People from Nairobi
Artists from Nairobi
Kenyan photographers
Italian photographers
Italian women writers
Italian writers
Italian film actresses
1931 births
Living people
Kenyan women photographers